Rafał Niżnik (born December 11, 1974 in Żary) is a Polish footballer who plays for Motor Lublin.

Career

Club
In January 2011, he joined Motor Lublin on a half year deal.

References

External links
 

Polish footballers
Polish expatriate footballers
1974 births
Living people
Górnik Łęczna players
Brøndby IF players
Górnik Zabrze players
ŁKS Łódź players
Brønshøj Boldklub players
Ekstraklasa players
Danish Superliga players
Expatriate men's footballers in Denmark
People from Żary
Sportspeople from Lubusz Voivodeship
Association football midfielders